Nocardioides insulae is a Gram-positive bacterium from the genus Nocardioides which has been isolated from soil from Dokdo, Korea.

References

Further reading

External links
Type strain of Nocardioides insulae at BacDive -  the Bacterial Diversity Metadatabase	

insulae
Bacteria described in 2007